Dimitrios Tzimourtos (born 10 February 1981) is a Greek handball player as a right wing. He competed in the men's handball tournament at the 2004 Summer Olympics.

References

External links 
 
 
 
 

1981 births
Living people
Greek male handball players
Olympic handball players of Greece
Handball players at the 2004 Summer Olympics
Sportspeople from Veria